Henrieville is a town in Garfield County, Utah, United States, along Utah Scenic Byway 12. As of the 2010 census, the town population was 230, up from 159 at the 2000 census.

The community was named after James Henrie, a Mormon leader.

Geography

Henrieville is in southern Garfield County, along Utah State Route 12.

Climate
The climate in this area has mild differences between highs and lows, and there is adequate rainfall year-round.  According to the Köppen Climate Classification system, Henrieville has a hot and cold arid desert climate, abbreviated "BWk" on climate maps.

Demographics

As of the census of 2000, there were 159 people, 57 households, and 40 families residing in the town. The population density was 941.9 people per square mile (361.1/km2). There were 83 housing units at an average density of 491.7 per square mile (188.5/km2). The racial makeup of the town was 99.37% White and 0.63% Native American. Hispanic or Latino of any race were 1.89% of the population.

There were 57 households, out of which 33.3% had children under the age of 18 living with them, 64.9% were married couples living together, 7.0% had a female householder with no husband present, and 28.1% were non-families. 26.3% of all households were made up of individuals, and 17.5% had someone living alone who was 65 years of age or older. The average household size was 2.79, and the average family size was 3.41.

In the town, the population was spread out, with 32.1% under 18, 6.3% from 18 to 24, 20.8% from 25 to 44, 22.6% from 45 to 64, and 18.2% who were 65 years of age or older. The median age was 37 years. For every 100 females, there were 74.7 males. For every ten females aged 18 and over, there were eight males.

The median income for a household in the town was $28,500, and the median income for a family was $35,000. Males had a median income of $21,667 versus $22,500 for females. The per capita income was $12,231. About 4.5% of families and 8.6% of the population were below the poverty line, including 10.2% of those under eighteen and 11.1% of those 65 or over.

See also
 
 List of cities and towns in Utah

References

See also

Towns in Garfield County, Utah
Towns in Utah
Populated places established in 1878